Ottelia muricata  is a species of aquatic plant native to central and southern Africa.

References

muricata